Po is a parish of the municipality of Llanes, Asturias, in the coast of northern Spain.  The small town of Po is situated about 2 kilometers from the capital of the municipality. 

It has the shortest name in Spain.

References

Parishes in Llanes